Bassettia is a genus of gall wasps found in North America.

Taxonomic history
This genus was circumscribed by William Harris Ashmead in 1887. Ashmead named the genus after "Mr. H. F. Bassett, of Waterbury, Conn., who has done so much towards advancing our knowledge of these intricate Hymenopters". Two species were included in the genus's initial circumscription: B. floridana, described in the same work, and B. tenuicornis. Bassett had described the latter species in 1881, placing it in the genus Cynips.

Ashmead later designated B. floridana as the genus's type species.

Species
A 2007 revision of the genus by G. Melika and W. G. Abrahamson recognizes the following eight species in this genus:
 Bassettia archboldi  — Florida
 Bassettia floridana  — Connecticut, Florida
 Bassettia gemmae  — Missouri, Illinois, District of Columbia
 Bassettia ligni  — California, Oregon
 Bassettia pallida  — Georgia, Florida
 Bassettia tenuana  — New Mexico
 Bassettia virginiana  — Virginia
 Bassettia weldi  — Arizona

Subsequent changes include the addition of:
 Bassettia caulicola  — Panama

Former species
Melika and Abrahamson transferred or restored these species from Bassettia to Callirhytis  in 2002. They had been included in Weld's 1951 taxonomy of Bassettia.
 Callirhytis aquaticae 
 Callirhytis ceropteroides 
 Callirhytis herberti 
 Callirhytis quercuscatesbaei

References

Further reading

 
 
 
 
 
 
 

Cynipidae
Hymenoptera genera
Taxa named by William Harris Ashmead